The Clyde Frog Show (stylized on-air as the CLYDE FROG show) is a television program for children in the 1970s. It was produced by the Mississippi Authority for Educational Television (MAETV).  In the show, puppets, most notably the title character, taught children about self-esteem, feelings, and attitudes.  The program's entire run consisted of 28 episodes.  Clyde Frog, however, originally appeared in another MAETV program entitled About Safety, in which puppets were used to convey messages about safety and first aid.  About Safety ran for 47 episodes.  The shows were quite successful, and MAETV syndicated the programs; thus, they were seen throughout the United States.

Educational goals
The Mississippi Public Broadcasting School Resource Guide summarizes the goals of The Clyde Frog Show: "This series is designed to help elementary children understand and better cope with their own feelings and attitudes. Each program contains a dramatization of typical events in the life of a child followed by a talk show segment. All of the puppet characters in the stories appear in the talk show to discuss their feelings."

By grade level, the specific goals are: Kindergarten: Explain healthy ways in which feelings may be expressed. Define individual responsibility and its relationship to one's self, family and community. First grade: Identify factors that contribute to individuality. Identify the importance of expressing emotions in a healthy way. Define individual responsibility and its relationship to one's self, family, and community. Second grade: Explain the importance of positive interpersonal relationships.

Episodes
There are 28 episodes total, each 3 to 6 minutes long. The episodes, as grouped roughly by subject into 10 groups by MAETV, are:
 Big and Little – What Am I Good At? – Boys/Girls Are Supposed To...
 It Hurts to Be Left Out – What's So Funny? – Being Scared
 Clyde Stays Up Late – Dr. Frog's Birthday Present – Sincere Camera
 All by Myself – Keeping Up with Your Stuff – Cooperating
 Look What I Can Do! – Can't Do It Yet – Worrying
 Friends – Doing Things Right – Clyde's Dinner Party
 Making Decisions – Doing What You Think Is Right – Why Am I Punished?
 Suzy's Test – Max's Story – Mrs. Mulch's Story
 When Your Friend Moves Away – End-of-the-Year Blues – Clyde's Favorite Toy
 Putting It All Together

In popular culture
The character Clyde Frog has been featured in several episodes of South Park as a favorite stuffed toy of Eric Cartman, serving as a way to help Cartman get ideas on his own. The toy was "killed" in the 2011 episode "1%".

Notes

References
 

1970s American children's television series
American children's education television series
Personal development television series
American television shows featuring puppetry
Television series about frogs
1973 American television series debuts
1974 American television series endings